Zhongtan Road is the name of a station on Shanghai Metro Line 3 and Line 4. It's near Tanziwan, a river Bay on Suzhou Creek.

References

Shanghai Metro stations in Putuo District
Line 3, Shanghai Metro
Line 4, Shanghai Metro
Railway stations in China opened in 2000
Railway stations in Shanghai